Guadalupe is a 2006 Family-Drama and Fantasy-History  film.

Cast
 José Carlos Ruiz as Juan Diego
 Pedro Armendáriz Jr. as Simon

Box office
In the US it made 848,139 dollars.

References

External links
 
 
 

2006 drama films
2006 films
2006 fantasy films
Mexican drama films
2000s Spanish-language films
2000s Mexican films